Adil Huseyn oghlu Guliyev (22 November 192216 December 1992) was an Azerbaijani fighter pilot in the Soviet Air Force who became a flying ace with twenty shootdowns during the Second World War. A recipient of the title Hero of the Soviet Union for his feats, he remained in the Soviet Air Force and retired with the rank of colonel in 1966. Later he became a director of Baku Airport.

Early life 
Guliyev was born on 22 November 1922 in Baku to a peasant family. He graduated from either School No. 14 or School No. 132 in Baku. He participated in the activities of the Baku Flying Club.

World War II 
In 1941 he was drafted into the Red Army. In April he became a student at the Stalingrad Military Aviation School, from which he graduated in the following year. On 7 July 1942 Guliyev became a sergeant in the 8th Reserve Fighter Aviation Regiment. From October 1942, Guliyev fought in combat. He served in the 653rd Fighter Aviation Regiment (which became the 65th Guards Fighter Aviation Regiment). It was part of the 274th Fighter Aviation Division, which became the 4th Guards Fighter Aviation Division. Guliyev fought in missions over Velikiye Luki in November 1942.

In the winter of 1943, the regiment was deployed to the Northwestern Front in the Demyansk Pocket area. In 1943, Guliyev became a Communist Party of the Soviet Union member. On 6 March, Guliyev claimed his first victory, a Bf 109. On 14 March, in the Staraya Russa area, he was attacked by four Fw 190s. Guliyev downed one but his plane was shot down. He bailed out and was rescued by Soviet troops close to the front line. On 15 March he was awarded the Order of the Red Star.  Shortly afterwards, the aviation division was transferred to the reserve south of Moscow. There the regiment and division became guards units. In May Guliyev flew missions over Bryansk, by which time he was a junior lieutenant and then a lieutenant. He fought in the Battle of Kursk, during which he made 51 sorties and shot down three Fw 190s.  He received his first Order of the Red Banner on 9 October.

From 30 November, Guliyev's unit was part of the 1st Baltic Front. The regiment became part of the 3rd Belorussian Front on 21 June 1944. During the month of June Guliyev made 34 sorties and shot down four fighters and a bomber. During the month Guliyev and his unit covered the attack of the 3rd Belorussian Front towards Orsha, conducted aerial reconnaissance and blocked German airfields. On 23 June Guliyev shot down an Fw 190. By this time he was a senior lieutenant. By the end of summer 1944 he had shot down 15 German aircraft. On 10 July, with his flight over Vilnius, Guliyev reportedly attacked a German formation of 17 bombers with fighter over. Guliyev shot down an Fw 190 and a Ju 87 during the battle. On 21 July 1944 Guliyev was awarded a second Order of the Red Banner for this action. At the end of July the regiment became part of the 1st Baltic Front again. He was awarded the Order of the Patriotic War 1st class on 19 August. By 10 September, he had reportedly made 141 sorties, participated in 38 air battles, and shot down fifteen enemy aircraft. On 17 September, Guliyev was awarded a third Order of the Red Banner.

In February 1945 the regiment was moved to Memel, covering the 1st Baltic Front. Guliyev became a captain and deputy squadron commander and navigator in the regiment. On 21 February he shot down an Fw 190. On 23 February 1945 he was awarded the title Hero of the Soviet Union and the Order of Lenin. In March the regiment, then based at Šiauliai, began retraining on the Yakovlev Yak-3. On 19 April, the regiment joined the rest of the division in the Berlin Offensive. By the end of the war, Guliyev had shot down twenty German aircraft in 265 sorties and 64 air battles. On 31 July 1945 Guliyev was awarded the Order of Alexander Nevsky for his actions.

Postwar 
After the end of the war, Guliyev continued to serve with the Soviet Air Force and  graduated from the Air Force Academy in 1956. He became a deputy commander and later commanded an aviation regiment. He retired as a colonel in 1966 and lived in Baku. He worked as a director of Baku Airport and later was department head in the Azerbaijan Consumer Society. Guliyev published two books of memoirs, "До встречи в Берлине", or "See you in Berlin" in 1975 and Есть пламя!, or "There are flames!" in 1985, respectively. On 6 April 1985 he received the Order of the Patriotic War 1st class a second time on the 40th anniversary of the end of World War II. Guliyev died on 16 December 1992 and was buried in the Alley of Honor. For his service to the Soviet Union, he received the Order of Lenin, Order of the Red Banner, Order of Alexander Nevsky, Order of the Patriotic War and the Order of the Red Star.

List of victories 
The data in this list is from Mikhail Bykov.

Awards
 Hero of the Soviet Union
 Order of Lenin
 Three Order of the Red Banner
 Order of Alexander Nevsky
 Two Order of the Patriotic War 1st class
 Order of the Red Star
 campaign and jubilee medals

References 

1922 births
1992 deaths
Soviet World War II flying aces
Heroes of the Soviet Union
Recipients of the Order of Lenin
Communist Party of the Soviet Union members
Recipients of the Order of the Red Banner
Recipients of the Order of Alexander Nevsky
Military personnel from Baku
Soviet military personnel of World War II from Azerbaijan
Azerbaijani memoirists
20th-century memoirists